The Men's Hammer Throw event at the 2005 World Championships in Athletics was held at the Helsinki Olympic Stadium on August 6 and August 8.

Medalists

Schedule
All times are Eastern European Time (UTC+2)

Abbreviations
All results shown are in metres

Startlist

Records

Qualification

Final

See also
2005 Hammer Throw Year Ranking

External links
IAAF results, heats
IAAF results, final
 hammerthrow.wz

Hammer throw
Hammer throw at the World Athletics Championships